Rajni Basumatary is an Indian filmmaker and actress, best known for her role of Mary Kom's mother (Mangte Akham Kom) in the 2014 Hindi film Mary Kom. Basumatary has written and produced the highly acclaimed feature film Anurag. Her directorial debut Raag was released in all major cities in India in 2014.

Basumatary is the director of the 2019 film Jwlwi - The Seed.

Early life and education
Basumatary was born in a Boro family and hails from the town of Rangapara, Assam in northeast India. She has recounted her experience of growing up in politically violent times during state insurgency and during the rise of separatist groups and how they impacted her family, childhood and later film career. She would later go on to direct Jwlwi - The Seed, with the film being loosely inspired by her experiences.

Basumatary received her undergraduate degree in Assamese literature from Handique Girls College, Guwahati University.

Career
In 1995, Basumatary moved to Delhi and began directing corporate films. In 2004, she produced and wrote the screenplay for Anuraag, an Assamese-language romantic drama film. Directed by Bidyut Chakraborty, this film also sees Basumatary in a supporting acting role. Anurag was critically acclaimed at its time of release, winning several Assam State Film Awards such as Best Director.

Since the 2000s, she has been a part of print and TV campaigns including Axis Bank and has played minor roles in Bollywood films such as Mary Kom and The Shaukeens as well as in independent films such as Shuttlecock Boys and III Smoking Barrels. She is also the brand Ambassador of Systematic Voters' Education and Electoral Participation (SVEEP).

In 2014, she had her big break when she played Indian boxer Mary Kom's mother in the biopic Mary Kom. Starring Priyanka Chopra in the lead role, the film received critical and commercial acclaim. In the same year, Basumatary released the Assamese feature film Raag, which was her directorial debut. Starring Adil Hussain, Zerifa Wahid and Kenny Basumatary, it was produced by Assam State Film in association with Basumatary’s banner Manna Films. It was released all over Assam and in selected cities such as Delhi, Bengaluru, Chennai, Hyderabad, Kolkata and Mumbai. Raag was nominated for the Prag Cine Awards in 14 categories including Best Director and Best Screenplay for Basumatary, Best Actor Female for Wahid, Best Actor Male for Adil Hussain, and Best Supporting Actor Male for Kenny Basumatary. It finally won Best Actor Male for Hussain.

In 2019, Basumatary directed her second feature film Jwlwi - The Seed, which was co-produced by artist and philanthropist Jani Viswanath and partially crowdfunded through Wishberry. An independent Bodo-language film, Jwlwi was screened in various international film festivals in India in late 2019 and early 2020 including Bengaluru International Film Festival, Chennai International Film Festival, Guwahati International Film Festival, Kolkata International Film Festival and Pune International Film Festival. Basumatary received the Special Jury Award for directing in Guwahati and a Special Jury Mention in Bengaluru for the film. She also received the Best Screen Writer award at the 4th Sailadhar Baruah Memorial Film Awards. Jwlwi is yet to be commercially released in screens outside of Assam.

Basumatary has noted Satyajit Ray, David Lean and Vishal Bhardwaj to be her favorite film directors. Her inspiration for making movies has always been her son Orga Basumatary, currently pursuing M.A. HRM & LR, at TISS Mumbai.

Filmography

References

External links
 
 

Assamese-language film directors
Indian film actresses
Actresses in Assamese cinema
Indian women film directors
Actresses from Assam
Screenwriters from Assam
Film producers from Assam
Women artists from Assam
21st-century Indian actresses